is a railway station in the town of Fukaura, Aomori Prefecture, Japan, operated on the East Japan Railway Company (JR East).

Lines

Platforms

Station layout

Kitakanegasawa  Station has two ground-level opposed side platforms connected by a level crossing. The station is unattended and is managed from Goshogawara Station. The station is a kan'i itaku station, administered by Goshogawara Station, and operated by Fukaura municipal authority, with point-of-sales terminal installed. Ordinary tickets, express tickets, and reserved-seat tickets for all JR lines are on sale.

History

Kitakanegasawa Station was opened on October 20, 1931 as a station on the Japan National Railways (JNR). With the privatization of the JNR on April 1, 1987, it came under the operational control of JR East.

Surrounding area

Fukaura Town office Ōdose branch office
Kitakanegasawa Post office

See also
 List of Railway Stations in Japan

External links

References

Stations of East Japan Railway Company
Railway stations in Aomori Prefecture
Gonō Line
Fukaura, Aomori
Railway stations in Japan opened in 1931
Railway stations in Japan opened in 1953